Fezile Mpela (born 16 November 1973), is a South African actor, singer, voice artist, presenter and MC. He is best known for the roles in the television serials such as; Mzansi, 7de Laan, Erfsondes and Getroud met Rugby.

Personal life
Mpela was born on 16 November 1973 in Krugersdorp, South Africa. He graduated with a degree in drama at the Pretoria Technikon, which is currently known as Tshwane University of Technology.

In 2014, he married Marilyn Natasha, but later divorced in 2018. In October 2019, Natasha committed suicide where she hung herself at her parents' home in Tembisa, Johannesburg.

Career
In April 1994, he joined M-Net as a continuity presenter. In 1994, he got the opportunity to host The All Africa Film Awards. Since then, he had the privilege to host many award ceremonies in the preceding years including: the Loerie Awards, The SAMA Awards in 2005, Mr and Mrs Pretoria, and many M-Net events. From 2003 to 2004, he hosted the South African version of the international cooking show Ready Steady Cook telecast on SABC2. In August 2008, he hosted the SABC2 game show Where Were You?.

In 2003, he made television acting debut with the DStv's kykNET and M-Net serial Song vir Katryn by playing the role "Hoffie". In 2005, he played the lead role of "Vusi" in the first season of Mzansi. Even though his role became very popular, he quit from the serial due to other commitments where he was replaced by Thapelo Mokoena for the second season. In 2007, he appeared in the SABC2 drama comedy Andries Plak by playing the lead role "Paulus Tshukudu". Then in April 2008, he made a guest role "Prosper Baloyi" in the SABC1 drama serial Mtunzini.com. In the same year, he played the lead role "Lucky" in the SABC1 mini-series Izingane zoBaba, which was an adaptation of William Shakespeare's King Lear. In 2009, he was appointed as the narrator of the first season of the genealogy documentary serial Who Do You Think You Are?.

In 2011, he joined with the SABC1 drama serial Intsika and played the role of "corrupt mayor Malusi". Then in 2012, he worked as the voice over artist for the M-Net reality competition serial MasterChef South Africa for three seasons. In 2013, he played the role "Thato "TT" Mgale" in the SABC3 drama series High Rollers. After receiving popularity for his role, he continued to play the role until the conclusion of the third season. Meanwhile, he won the Golden Horn Award for Best Supporting Actor in a TV Drama Series at the SAFTAs for his role in the series Donkerland. In 2016, he appeared in the kykNET soap opera Getroud met Rugby with the role "Ike", where he later played the role for three seasons.

Mpela also made supportive roles in the films such as; Drum, The Lion King and Born Free 2. In 2006, he acted in two direct-to-video films: Coup! and Folge deinem Herzen. Apart from television and cinema, he made extensive theatre appearances where he played in the stage plays: Songs and Tales from Africa, Kapt'uit op Afrikaans, Joseph and the Amazing Technicolour Dreamcoat, Too Many Cooks, Museum of Modern Mistakes, The Blacks, Roses and Angels, and Private Venture.

Filmography

References

External links
 IMDb

1973 births
Living people
South African male film actors
South African male television actors
South African male stage actors